"Overjoyed" is a song by American Christian rock group Jars of Clay. It was the fourth single from the band's second album, Much Afraid, and the fourth consecutive No. 1 radio single from the album. An acoustic rendition of the song appears on the band's 2003 double album, Furthermore: From the Studio, From the Stage. This song was also the compilation album WOW 1998.

Track listing
"Overjoyed" - 2:58 (Charlie Lowell, Dan Haseltine, Matt Odmark, Stephen Mason, Mark Hudson, Greg Wells)

Performance credits
Dan Haseltine - vocals, percussion
Charlie Lowell - keyboards, piano, organ, background vocals
Stephen Mason - guitars, background vocals
Matt Odmark - guitars, background vocals
Greg Wells - drums, bass

Technical credits
Stephen Lipson - producer
Robert Beeson - executive producer
Heff Moraes - engineering, mixing
Chuck Linder - recording
Mike Griffith - engineering
Adam Hatley - engineering assistant
Stephen Marcussen - mastering
Don C. Tyler - digital editing

1998 singles
Jars of Clay songs
Songs written by Mark Hudson (musician)
Songs written by Dan Haseltine
Songs written by Stephen Mason (musician)
Songs written by Greg Wells
Song recordings produced by Stephen Lipson
1997 songs
Essential Records (Christian) singles